Operation Project 58/58A was a series of 4 nuclear tests conducted by the United States in 1957–1958 at the Nevada Test Site. These tests followed the Operation Plumbbob series and preceded the Operation Hardtack I series.

All the tests in Project 58 were one-point safety tests. They were intended to freeze device designs prior to full-scale tests at Operation Hardtack I. No significant yield was expected from either, but the second, Coulomb-C, a surface test conducted on December 9, produced an unanticipated yield of 500 tons. Shortly after detonation, fallout readings of fifty roentgens per hour were recorded on the Mercury Highway, and, as the cloud moved toward the southwest, personnel at Jackass Flats involved in construction for future nuclear rocket testing were forced to take cover. Eventually, the cloud reached the Los Angeles area where readings caused public concern.

References

1957 in Nevada
1958 in Nevada
Explosions in 1957
Explosions in 1958
1957 in military history
1958 in military history
Nevada Test Site nuclear explosive tests